Diana Fehr (born 9 March 1974) is a retired Liechtensteiner alpine skier who competed in the 1998 Winter Olympics.

References

External links
 

1974 births
Living people
Liechtenstein female alpine skiers
Olympic alpine skiers of Liechtenstein
Alpine skiers at the 1998 Winter Olympics
Place of birth missing (living people)
20th-century Liechtenstein women